The Sompura Brahmin are a Hindu caste found in the state of Gujarat and Rajasthan in India. They are a sub-group of the Brahmin community.

History and origin
According to their traditions, the Sompura Brahmin are so named because they were created by the god Chandra to perform sacred ceremonies called Som Yajna for the god Shiva. They are concentrated in the town of Prabas Patan and form one of the oldest Brahmin communities in Gujarat; they speak Gujarati.
Skand puran gives reference for the creation of Sompura Brahmins wide its chapter 21/22/23/24
The agnihotri brahmins from chandra lok came to prabhas with hemgarbha -the chief secretary of moon god to conduct-perform a pratishtha yagya of the first temple of lord somnath and after the yagya the moon god requested these Brahmins to stay there. These Brahmins stayed near somnath so they are called Sompura brahmins.
Generally the civilisations develops and moves with the source of water worldwide, but the sompura brahmin is the only class who are stable near somnath for at least 2000 years.

Present circumstances
Like other Brahmin communities, they consist of gotras which are exogamous. The Sompuras have 18 gotras. Eleven of them are spread all over Gujarat and Rajasthan and practice temple architecture with shilp-shastra. Most of the other seven gotras stay near Prabhas/Somnath; their main profession was and still is yajman vrutti (priestly services) in the temples, particularly in and around Somnath. Sompura Brahman are priest in Somnath Temple. The community  is moving very highly  in  society  in  both   business  and  education. They are strict vegetarians.

See also

Sachora Brahmin
Sompura Salat

References

Social groups of Gujarat
Brahmin communities of Gujarat